Wendell Brunious (born October 27, 1954, New Orleans) is an American jazz trumpeter and bandleader.

Born on October 27, 1954, Brunious was born into a Louisiana Creole family, the son of Nazimova "Chinee" Santiago and John "Picket" Brunious, Sr., a trumpeter who studied at Juilliard and played with the Onward Brass Band, Young Tuxedo Brass Band, and Paul Barbarin, and who arranged for Billy Eckstine and Cab Calloway. Brunious' brother John Brunious, Jr., was another notable New Orleans jazz trumpeter and a predecessor as bandleader of Preservation Hall Jazz Band. His nephew is Mark Braud, a successor as bandleader of Preservation Hall Jazz Band.

Brunious sang in Chief John and the Mahogany Hall Stompers in the 1960s, a group in which his father was also a member. He began on trumpet at age 11 and played at Paul Barbarin's funeral. He studied at Southern University (where he played with Danny Barker) and played dance music in clubs on Bourbon Street in the middle of the 1970s.

In 1976, Brunious substituted for his father in Albert "Papa" French's band for Mardi Gras, and by 1979 was playing regularly at Preservation Hall with Kid Thomas Valentine. He was named leader of the group upon Valentine's death in 1987. He also played with the Eureka Brass Band (1980), Lionel Hampton (1981), Linda Hopkins (1984), and Sammy Rimington (1984). He played with Louis Nelson in 1986-89, and did recordings with the Caledonia Jazz Band of Norway in 1986 and 1987. His first record as a leader came in 1986, which featured Nelson, Rimington, and Barry Martyn as sidemen. He later played with Michael White, Chris Barber, Papa Don Vappie, Bob Wilber, and the Pfister Sisters. He has remained a regular performer at Preservation Hall into the 2010s.

Discography
 In the Tradition (GHB, 1986)
 Down in Honky Tonk Town (Wendell Brunious - Great Ideas Hb, 1996, September 9 at Audiophile Studio, New Orleans)
 Wendell Brunious (Wendell Brunious - Great Ideas Hb, 1998, August 28 in New Orleans)
 Mama Don't Allow It (GHB, 2003)

References
Gary W. Kennedy, "Wendell Brunious".  Grove Jazz online.

1954 births
Living people
American jazz trumpeters
American male trumpeters
American jazz bandleaders
Jazz musicians from New Orleans
21st-century trumpeters
21st-century American male musicians
American male jazz musicians
Preservation Hall Jazz Band members
Southland Records artists